The Nutrition Education and Training (NET) Program is a program authorized through FY2003 under Section 19 of the Child Nutrition Act (P.L. 89-642). Funds are authorized to make grants to all states for a nutrition education program that targets school children, teachers, parents, and food service workers. Appropriators have not funded the program since FY1998. Between its inception in 1977 and 1994, the NET program had a time-limited authorization and funding (averaging $5 million per year), which was provided under annual appropriations laws. In 1994, however, the Child Nutrition Act was amended (P.L. 103-448) to make NET permanent and funding of $10 million annually was mandated for the program. Two years later, amendments to the Child Nutrition Act (P.L. 104-193) restored NET to temporary status and again made funding for it subject to appropriations. The change in the authorizing statute occurred after the FY1997 appropriations had been enacted so it was necessary to reprogram funds from Team Nutrition ($3.75 million) to continue NET activities for that year. The FY1998 appropriation for NET was $3.75 million. Subsequently, appropriators have funded nutrition education and training activities under Team Nutrition; no funding has been provided explicitly for the NET program.

References 

United States Department of Agriculture
Training programs